The Chief of the General Staff of Czechoslovakia refers to the chief of the General Staff of the Czechoslovak Army and the Czechoslovak People's Army, during the existence of Czechoslovakia from 1918 to 1992.

List of chiefs of the general staff

Czechoslovak Armed Forces (1919–1939)
Chief of the Main Staff

Commander-in-Chief of the Armed Forces

Czechoslovak military administration (France, 1940)

Ministry of National Defense (United Kingdom, 1940–1945)
Chief of Staff

Commander-in-Chief of the Armed Forces

Czechoslovak Armed Forces (1945–1950)

Czechoslovak Army (1950–1954)

Czechoslovak People's Army (1954–1990)

Czechoslovak Army (1990–1992)

Trivia
The first two Chiefs of the General Staff of Czechoslovakia were French, as the General Staff was founded by the French Military Mission to Czechoslovakia.

See also
Chief of the General Staff (Czech Republic)
Chief of the General Staff (Slovakia)

Notes

External links
Chiefs of the General Staff of Czechoslovakia 1919–1992

Chiefs of the General Staff (Czechoslovakia)
Czechoslovakia
Military of Czechoslovakia
1919 establishments in Czechoslovakia
1992 disestablishments in Czechoslovakia